Waziristan (Pashto and , "land of the Wazir") is a mountainous region covering the former FATA agencies of North Waziristan and South Waziristan which are now districts of Khyber Pakhtunkhwa province of Pakistan. The area is populated by ethnic Pashtuns. It is named after the Wazir tribe. The language spoken in the valley is Pashto, predominantly the Waziri dialect. The region forms the southern part of Pakistan's Federally Administered Tribal Areas, which is now part of Khyber Pakhtunkhwa province.
The 16th-century Pashtun revolutionary leader and warrior-poet Bayazid Pir Roshan, who wrote the oldest known book in Pashto, was based in Kaniguram, Waziristan.

Etymology 
Waziristan is Derived from the word Wazir which is the Pashtun tribe ("Land of the Wazir") that is situated in North Waziristan. Despite this other tribes such as Mehsud, Kakar, Sherani, Dawar, Burki and Syeds are also situated in Waziristan

Overview and history 

Waziristan lies between the Kurram river to the north and the Gomal River to the south. It is bordered by Bannu and Tank Districts, FR DI Khan, and Kurram Agency to the east and northeast, Sherani and Musakhel Districts of Baluchistan to the south in Pakistan and Khost, Paktia, and Paktika Provinces of Afghanistan to the west and north.

Waziristan is divided into two agencies now districts of Khyber Pakhtunkhwa province of Pakistan, North Waziristan and South Waziristan. According to 2017 census of Pakistan, the population of North Waziristan is 543,254 while that of South Waziristan is 674,065. The two parts have quite distinct characteristics, though both are inhabited by the Wazir and Mahsud (or Maseed) tribes. They have a reputation as formidable warriors.

British Era 
The British entered Waziristan in 1894, when the boundary with Afghanistan, Durand Line was determined. They divided Waziristan into two agencies, North Waziristan and South Waziristan; they also introduced a regular system of land record and revenue administration for the most fertile part of the Tochi valley. After the British military operations, a Political Agent for South Waziristan was permanently appointed with its headquarters at Wanna; another was appointed for North Waziristan with headquarters at Miranshah.

Waziristan Revolt (1919–1920)

In the rugged and remote region of Waziristan on British India's northwest border with Afghanistan, mountain tribes of Muslim fighters rebelled against the British Indian Army in numerous operations. The Waziristan Revolt of 1919–1920 was sparked by the Afghan invasion of British India in 1919. Though the British made peace with the Afghans, the Waziri and Mahsud tribesmen gave the imperial (almost entirely Indian) forces a very difficult fight. Some of the tribesmen were veterans of the British-organised local militias that were irregular elements of the British Indian Army, and used some modern Lee–Enfield rifles against the British Indian forces sent into Waziristan. One aspect of this conflict was the effective use of air power against the Waziris and Mahsuds. This is similar to Royal Air Force tactics in suppressing the Arab Revolt in Iraq in 1920 and 1921.

Faqir of Ipi

In 1935–36, a Hindu-Muslim clash occurred over a Hindu girl of Bannu, who was abducted and forced to convert to Islam. The tribesmen rallied around Mirzali Khan, a Tori Khel Wazir, who was later given the title of "the Faqir of Ipi" by the British. Jihad was declared against the British. Mirzali Khan, with his huge lashkar (force), started a guerrilla warfare against the British forces in Waziristan.

In 1938, Mirzali Khan shifted from Ipi to Gurwek, a remote village on the Durand Line, where he declared an independent state and continued the raids against the British forces. In June 1947, Mirzali Khan, along with his allies, including the Khudai Khidmatgars and members of the Provincial Assembly, declared the Bannu Resolution. The resolution demanded that the Pashtuns be given a choice to have an independent state of Pashtunistan, composing all Pashtun majority territories of British India, instead of being made to join Pakistan. However, the British Raj refused to comply with the demand of this resolution. After the creation of Pakistan in August 1947, Mirzali Khan and his followers refused to recognise Pakistan, and launched a campaign against Pakistan. They continued their guerilla warfare against the new nation's government. He didn't surrender to the government of Pakistan throughout his life. However, his popularity among the people of Waziristan declined over the years, with many jirgas in Waziristan deciding to support Pakistan. He died a natural death in 1960 in Gurwek.

U.S. War on Terror

In the early stage of the U.S. invasion of Afghanistan, when the Taliban started fleeing into Pakistan, the local leaders, or Maliks, began a campaign among their locals to host the foreigners. Since then, around 200 Maliks have been assassinated by local Taliban through targeted killings.

To end the Waziristan war, Pakistan signed the Waziristan Accord with chieftains from the self-styled Islamic Emirate of Waziristan on 5 September 2006. The Islamic militants in Waziristan are said to have close affiliations with the Taliban. Waziristan is often mentioned as a haven for al-Qaeda fighters. There is speculation that some al-Qaeda leaders have found refuge in the area controlled by the Emirate, which is a staging ground for militant operations in Afghanistan.

On 4 June 2007, the National Security Council of Pakistan met to decide the fate of Waziristan and take up a number of political and administrative issues in order to control the "Talibanization" of the area. The meeting was chaired by President Pervez Musharraf and attended by the Chief Ministers and Governors of all four provinces. They discussed the deteriorating law and order situation and the threat posed to state security. The government decided to take a number of actions to stop the "Talibanization" and to crush the armed militancy in the Tribal regions and the NWFP.

Due to the ongoing military operations against the Taliban, nearly 100,000 people have already fled to Afghanistan's Khost province to seek shelter. The UN and other aid agencies are helping more than 470,000 people who have been displaced from Pakistan's North Waziristan region due to the ongoing military operations.

The Ministry of the Interior has played a large part in the information gathering for the operations against the militants and their institutions. The Ministry of the Interior has prepared a list of militant commanders operating in the region and they have also prepared a list of seminaries for monitoring. (Waziristan is a tribal area, and in any tribal area of Pakistan, no body can deploy police. There are other options like frontier corps (militia) and khasadar (local tribesmen force).) The government is also trying to strengthen law enforcement in the area by providing the NWFP Police with weapons, bullet-proof jackets, and night-vision devices. The paramilitary Frontier Corps is to be provided with artillery and APCs. The state agencies are also studying ways to jam illegal FM radio channels.

The US drone strikes programme has been responsible for numerous bombings in Waziristan, carried out with the approval of the Pakistani government.

The Wazir tribes are divided into clans governed by male village elders who meet in a tribal jirga. Socially and religiously, Waziristan is an extremely conservative area. Women are carefully guarded, and every household must be headed by a male figure. Tribal cohesiveness is also kept strong by means of the so-called Collective Responsibility Acts in the Frontier Crimes Regulations, which has since been repealed following the merger of FATA to Khyber Pakhunkhwa in May, 2018.

Taliban presence in the area has been an issue of international concern in the War on Terrorism particularly since the 2001 invasion of Afghanistan. In 2014, about 929,859 people were reported to be internally displaced from Waziristan as a result of Operation Zarb-e-Azb, a military offensive conducted by the Pakistan Armed Forces along the Pakistan - Afghanistan border.

North Waziristan

North Waziristan's capital is Miranshah. The area is mostly inhabited by the Dawar Tribe and the Utmanzai branch of the Darwesh Khel Waziris, who are related to Ahmedzai Waziris of South Waziristan, who live in fortified mountain villages, including Razmak, Datta Khel, Spin wam, Dosali, Shawa and Shawal. The Dawars (also known as Daurr or Daur), who live in the main Tochi Valley, farm in the valleys below in villages including Miranshah, Hamzoni, Darpakhel, Muhammadkhel, Boya, Degan, Banda, Ngharkali, Palangzai, Mirali, Edak, Hurmaz, Mussaki, Hassukhel, Ziraki, Tapi, Issori, Haiderkhel and Khaddi irrigated by the river Tochi.

South Waziristan

The South Waziristan has its district headquarters at Wanna. Up until 2021 its was not under the direct administration of the government of Pakistan, South Waziristan was previously and indirectly governed by a political agent, who has been either an outsider or a Waziri—a system inherited from the British Raj. Since, January 2021, South Waziristan has been incorporated as a district of the adjacent KPK province. In south Waziristan Agency, there are three tribes, Wazir, Maseed and Burki. Burki and Urmarh is the same tribe.

See also
 Bannu Division 
 Mirzali Khan
 Mulla Powinda
 Insurgency in Khyber Pakhtunkhwa
 Ghoriwala
 Razmak

References

Further reading
 Fürstenberg, Kai (2012) Waziristan: Solutions for a Troubled Region in Spotlight South Asia, No. 1,  (http://www.apsa.info/wp-content/uploads/2012/10/SSA-1.pdf )
 Roe, Andrew M. Waging War in Waziristan: The British Struggle in the Land of Bin Laden, 1849–1947 (Lawrence: University Press of Kansas, 2010) 313 pages
 Operations in Waziristan 1919–1920, Compiled by the General Staff, Army Headquarters, India, 1923 (Reprinted by Naval & Military Press and Imperial War Museum)
 Systems of Survival (1992) by Jane Jacobs. Jacobs cites a story from the 16 July 1974 issue of The Wall Street Journal in which a Pathan husband in Waziristan reportedly cut off his wife's nose because he was jealous. Thinking the better of it, he took her to a surgeon to have the injury repaired. Upon finding out that an operation would cost thirty rupees, he called it off, saying he could buy a new wife for eighty rupees. Jacobs cites this incident as evidence contradicting the platitude that society is based on the family. Instead, each family is based on whatever society it finds itself in. (Jacobs' discussion in her book is viewable on Amazon.com. Search for "Pathan".)

External links

  This includes an Empire-centric view of the politics and demographics.
 Waziristan and Mughal empire
 Nehru in Waziristan
 Sketch map of Waziristan
 Mehsuds and Wazirs, the King-makers in a game of thrones
 Lawrence of Arabia in Waziristan
 Audio slideshow: Waziristan's impossible border

 
Regions of Pakistan